McCrossan is a surname. It is similar to McCrossin.

List of people with the surname 
Anthony McCrossan, British sports commentator
Daniel McCrossan (born 1988), Northern Irish politician
Mary McCrossan (1865-1934), British artist
Paul McCrossan (born 1942), Canadian actuary and politician

Surnames
Surnames of British Isles origin